The superior surface of the body of the sphenoid bone is bounded behind by a ridge, which forms the anterior border of a narrow, transverse groove, the chiasmatic groove (optic groove, prechiasmatic sulcus), above and behind which lies the optic chiasma of cranial nerve 2 (the optic nerve).

The groove ends on either side in the optic foramen, which transmits the optic nerve and ophthalmic artery into the orbital cavity.

References

External links
 
  (#7)

Bones of the head and neck